Trupanea asteria is a species of tephritid or fruit flies in the genus Trupanea of the family Tephritidae.

Distribution
India, Indonesia, New Guinea, Solomon Islands.

References

Tephritinae
Insects described in 1868
Diptera of Asia
Diptera of Australasia